Sebastian Peaario Siataga (born 27 January 1993) is a New Zealand born Samoan rugby union player. His position is hooker.

References

External links
itsrugby.co.uk profile

1993 births
New Zealand rugby union players
Canterbury rugby union players
Bay of Plenty rugby union players
Chiefs (rugby union) players
Crusaders (rugby union) players
Southland rugby union players
Rugby union hookers
Living people